Tip-Top (often referred to as 'Pollo Tip-Top') is a national chain of restaurants in Nicaragua, predominantly selling chicken. It is headquartered in the country's capital city of Managua and is a franchise of Tip Top Industry.

History
Claudio Rosales and Lina Lacayo de Rosales started the business, in Nicaragua, in 1959 with the sale of processed crude chicken, a market of which dominated 70% a long time. The first restaurant was opened in 1959 in the center of old Managua

Expansion

Pollo Tip Top began its expansion in 2004 due to the creation of its tax exemption. The first were established in the cities of Estelí and Chinandega, in Nicaragua, but their goal for 2005 was to expand into Honduras, Panama, Costa Rica, and El Salvador.

Locations
 Nicaragua

13 (in Managua)
2 (in Matagalpa)
3 (in León)
2 (in Chinandega)
1 (in Bluefields)
2 (in Granada)
2 (in Estelí)
1 (in Juigalpa)
 1  in Corn island
 1   in Nueva Segovia
  1    in Masaya
 1     in Carazo
1 in Rivas
1 in Jinotega

See also
 List of chicken restaurants

References

External links
Official Website
Tip Top Industry Official Website
Envia Tip Top a Nicaragua por Internet tuNicaragua.com - Send Tip Top to your loved ones in Nicaragua

Poultry restaurants
Food and drink companies of Nicaragua
Restaurants established in 1959
Companies based in Managua